Harold Christopher Tennyson, 4th Baron Tennyson (25 March 191919 October 1991), was a British peer.

He was the oldest son of Lionel Tennyson, 3rd Baron Tennyson and the Hon. Clarissa Madeline Georgiana Felicite Tennant, his first marriage and her second. Harold was the great-grandson of poet Alfred, Lord Tennyson and succeeded his father as the 4th Baron Tennyson in 1951.

He studied at Eton College and Trinity College, Cambridge before joining the War Office in 1940. In later life he was co-founder with Sir Charles Tennyson of the Tennyson Research Centre, Lincoln.

He died unmarried in 1991, the title passing to his brother Mark.

1919 births
1991 deaths
Barons Tennyson
Eldest sons of British hereditary barons
Harold
War Office personnel in World War II